Hospitals: The White Mafia is a 1973 Italian drama film directed by Luigi Zampa and starring Enrico Maria Salerno and Gabriele Ferzetti. It was entered into the 1973 Cannes Film Festival.

Cast
 Gabriele Ferzetti
 Senta Berger
 Enrico Maria Salerno
 Claudio Gora
 Claudio Nicastro
 Tina Lattanzi
 Enzo Garinei
 Gino Pernice
 Antonella Steni
 Luciano Salce
 Sandro Dori
 Ernesto Colli
 Ezio Sancrotti
 Luciano Rossi
 Fausto Tommei

References

External links

1973 films
1970s Italian-language films
1973 drama films
Films directed by Luigi Zampa
Films set in hospitals
Medical-themed films
Films scored by Riz Ortolani
Italian drama films
1970s Italian films